The Augusta National Women's Amateur (ANWA) is a golf tournament in Georgia, held at Augusta National Golf Club in Augusta and Champions Retreat Golf Club in nearby Evans.  stroke play event debuted 

The tournament is split between the two venues, with Champions Retreat hosting the opening rounds on Wednesday and Thursday with a field size of 72 players on the Island and Bluff nines. A practice round is played on Friday at Augusta National with the full field. The field is cut to the top 30 players (with a playoff for the last spots if necessary) for the final round Saturday at Augusta National. The tournament is held on the week directly preceding the Masters Tournament.

The winner of the tournament receives invitations to the next five ANWAs, that year's U.S. Women's Open and Women's British Open, and any USGA, R&A, and PGA of America amateur events for which she is otherwise eligible prior to the next ANWA – all providing she remains an amateur.

Background 
Until 2012, Augusta National refused to formally admit women as members. Before the 2012 Masters Tournament, then-chairman William Porter Payne cited that in 2011, more than 15% of the non-tournament rounds were played by female players who were member guests or spouses of active members. On August 20, 2012, Augusta National admitted Condoleezza Rice and Darla Moore as its first female members.

Prior to the 2018 Masters Tournament, new Augusta National chairman Fred Ridley announced on April 4 that the club would host the Augusta National Women's Amateur beginning in 2019. He stated that holding such an event at Augusta National would have the "greatest impact" on women's golf.

Concerns were raised that the event would conflict with the LPGA Tour's first major, the ANA Inspiration (which has invited top amateur players to compete), Ridley stated that he had discussed the event with commissioner Mike Whan, and stated that he agreed on the notion that any move to bolster the prominence of women's golf would be a "win" for the LPGA over time. In 2021, as part of a new sponsorship agreement with Chevron Corporation, the ANA Inspiration was renamed The Chevron Championship, and will be relocated and moved to a later date (thus no longer conflicting with the ANWA) beginning 2023.

History
The inaugural tournament in 2019 was highlighted by a final round duel between eventual winner Jennifer Kupcho and María Fassi. Kupcho pulled away from Fassi by going five–under over the final six holes, winning by four strokes with a score of –10. Kupcho's back–nine performance included an eagle on the thirteenth hole. As with those who score an eagle during the Masters proper, Kupcho received a pair of inscribed crystal glasses for her achievement.

The 2020 tournament was cancelled due to the COVID-19 pandemic (which caused the 2020 Masters Tournament to likewise be rescheduled to November). All players invited to the tournament were invited back for 2021, provided that they were still an amateur at the time of the tournament.

Course

Winners

Media coverage 
The final round of the tournament was televised by NBC.

References

External links

Coverage from Augusta Chronicle

Amateur golf tournaments in the United States
Women's golf tournaments in the United States
Golf in Georgia (U.S. state)
History of women in Georgia (U.S. state)